The southern gray-cheeked salamander (Plethodon metcalfi) is a species of salamander in the family Plethodontidae endemic to the area where North Carolina, South Carolina, and Georgia adjoin each other in the southeastern United States. The species has a known altitudinal range of  256 to 1,295 m in the mountains of the region. Where their ranges overlap, it hybridizes with P. jordani and P. teyahalee.
Its natural habitat is temperate forests. It is threatened by habitat loss.

References

Amphibians of the United States
Plethodon
Natural history of the Great Smoky Mountains
Taxonomy articles created by Polbot
Amphibians described in 1912